Maurice Greene or Green may refer to:

Maurice Greene (composer) (1696–1755), English composer and organist
Maurice Greene (sprinter) (born 1974), American athlete
Maurice Green (cricketer) (1900-1952), Guyanese cricketer
Maurice Green (journalist) (1906–1987), English newspaper editor
Maurice Green (photographer) (1931–2008), Anglo-Indian writer and photographer
Maurice Green (virologist) (1926–2017) American virologist
Maurice Greene (fighter) (born 1986), American MMA fighter